"Just for the record" is the sixth episode of the 1969 ITC British television series Randall and Hopkirk (Deceased) starring Mike Pratt, Kenneth Cope and Annette Andre. The episode was first broadcast on 25 October 1969 on ITV. Directed by Jeremy Summers.

Synopsis

Cast
Mike Pratt as Jeff Randall
Kenneth Cope as Marty Hopkirk
Annette Andre as Jeannie Hopkirk
Ronald Radd ....  Pargiter
Olivia Hamnett ....  Anne Soames
Nosher Powell ....  Lord Dorking
Danny Green ....  Lord Surrey
Jan Rossini ....  Miss Moscow
Michael Beint ....  Senior Official
Jack Woolgar ....  Old Man
Katya Wyeth ....  Miss Budapest (as Kathja Wyeth)
Clifford Cocks ....  Attendant
Ken Watson ....  Police Sergeant

External links
http://www.anorakzone.com/randall

Randall and Hopkirk (Deceased) episodes
1969 British television episodes